This is a list of streets in San Gabriel Valley, California. They are grouped by type: arterial thoroughfares, commercial corridors, and other streets.

Arterial thoroughfares
Major east–west routes
 Arroyo Seco Parkway
 Huntington Drive
 Valley Boulevard
 Whittier Boulevard

Major north–south routes

 Atlantic Boulevard (Los Angeles County)
 Garfield Avenue (Los Angeles County)
 Garvey Avenue
 Glendale Boulevard
 Sierra Madre Boulevard

Commercial corridors
  California State Route 19 (aka Rosemead Boulevard)
  Angeles Crest Highway
  San Bernardino Freeway
  California State Route 60
  Foothill Freeway

Other streets

 Arrow Highway
 Azusa Avenue
 Christmas Tree Lane
 Colorado Boulevard
 Fair Oaks Avenue (Pasadena, California)
 Foothill Boulevard (Southern California)
 Lake Avenue (Pasadena)
 Mission Road (and Mission Drive)
 Orange Grove Boulevard (Pasadena)

Public transit 
 Foothill Transit
 Montebello Bus Lines
 Los Angeles County Metropolitan Transportation Authority

See also 

 El Camino Real (California)
 Mount Wilson Toll Road
 U.S. Route 66 in California
 Transportation in Los Angeles

External links

References

 
Los Angeles-related lists
San Gabriel Valley